Monomoy Regional High School is a regional secondary school located in Harwich, Massachusetts, United States, within Barnstable County. Monomoy Regional High School serves approximately 625 students in grades 8-12 from the towns of Chatham and Harwich.

Construction of the high school was completed in early 2014 and officially opened in September 2014. The school's mascot is the Sharks and the school colors are Navy Blue & Silver.

Athletics

All the athletic teams from Harwich High School and Chatham High School began competing cooperatively as the Monomoy Sharks in Fall 2012 for all sports offered by both schools.

Monomoy offers 20 interscholastic athletic teams along with multiple club and intramural teams. As of 2016, Monomoy is a member of the Cape & Islands League, which competes in the Division 4 level of athletic competition in Massachusetts, and is affiliated with the Massachusetts Interscholastic Athletic Association.

In May 2015, Monomoy Regional High School gained approval from the South Shore League at the annual league meeting to leave the league and join the Cape & Islands League, citing travel expenses and competition as the main factors regarding their departure. Monomoy was a member of the South Shore League since the mid-1990s. The change will take effect during the beginning of the 2016–17 academic year. The football team's league affiliation is in question due to the change, as the Cape & Islands League does not sponsor football. Ultimately, the Sharks will either continue to compete in the South Shore League as a football only member, or pursue an independent schedule with no league affiliation. With the departure of Monomoy, Mashpee is left as the South Shore League's lone representative from Cape Cod.

Recent Success in Sports: The Monomoy High School's Basketball team went from 1–19 in 2015-2016 while competing in the South Shore League to 15-6 after switching into the Cape and Islands League. The team went under a controversial time after the school's administration decided to fire beloved Coach and Harwich High School Alumni Adam Rose. Rose was then hired as a head coach at CCA. Monomoy then hired Coach Keith Arnold a former DY and Nauset boys basketball coach to take over. Part of the team's core of Junior-Meehan and Senior-Mazulis were Nauset Transfers who founded the foundation for Monomoy Basketball success. The team won the Cape and Islands Large League Title and also made it to the Division 4 South Sectional Finals as the #9 seed after beating Sturgis East, Southeastern, and Old Colony in the MIAA tournament. Later on the team would lose to D4 powerhouse Cathedral Catholic. Players Nick Meehan, Chris Mazulis, Sam Reed and Eli Nickerson were vital to this team's cinderella run in the MIAA tournament.

Listed below are the sports offered at Monomoy Regional High School:

Fall
 Football
 Field Hockey
 Boys' Soccer
 Girls' Soccer
 Cheerleading
 Cross Country
 Boys' Golf
Winter
 Boys' Basketball
 Girls' Basketball
 Ice Hockey (co-op with Mashpee)
 Cheerleading
Spring
 Baseball
 Softball
 Boys' Tennis
 Girls' Tennis
 Boys' Lacrosse
 Girls' Lacrosse
 Track & Field
 Sailing
 Girls' Golf

References

 Monomoy High School cost estimated at $65.4 million

2014 establishments in Massachusetts
Chatham, Massachusetts
Educational institutions established in 2014
Harwich, Massachusetts
Public high schools in Massachusetts
Schools in Barnstable County, Massachusetts